Chiwogs of Bhutan or chios ( chio) refer to the 1044 basic electoral precincts of Bhutan. Chiwogs are also former third-level administrative divisions of Bhutan below gewogs. Until 2009, they were the equivalent of municipalities or parishes, containing clusters of villages and hamlets. There are generally 5 or 6 chios in each geo, and in turn several geos in each dzongkha (district). To illustrate, there are 50 chios in Paro District alone. The majority of chios are small rural communities; more densely populated areas tend to be separate thromdes, or municipalities. A Chiwog Disaster Management Plan (CDMP) exists in some chios to form an effective responsive to any local disasters. Often, participants in the CDMP are also trained at a geo level for better coordination.

Legal status
Until 2009, chios were administrative divisions subordinate to geos. Under the 2008 Constitution, chios are mentioned only as electorates, defined as "under a gewog," but did not specifically repeal the administrative status of chios. Under the Election Act of 2008, chios are basic electoral constituencies within geos to elect one member of the Geo Tshokde (county committee) and Dzongkha Thromde (district council). The legal status of chios as electoral precincts is confirmed by the Local Government Act of 2009, which repeals the Local Government Act of 2007 and provides no administrative role for chios.

List of chios
The following is a list of the 1,044 chios of Bhutan as of 2011:

Notes

See also
Gewog
Thromde
List of villages in Bhutan

References

Subdivisions of Bhutan